Sudheer (died 1999) was an Indian actor in the Kannada film industry. Some of the notable films of Sudheer as an actor include SP Sangliyana 2 (1990), Nee Nanna Gellalare, Rama Lakshmana .

Career
Sudheer has been part of more than 200 movies in Kannada.

Personal life
Sudheer has two sons Nanda Kishore and Tharun Kishore Sudheer who both work as directors in Kannada film industry.

Filmography

See also

List of people from Karnataka
List of Indian film actors
Cinema of India

References

External links
 
 Biography of Sudheer on nettv4u.com
 Biography of Sudheer on filmibeat.com

1999 deaths
Indian male film actors
Kannada male actors
Male actors in Kannada cinema
Male actors from Karnataka
20th-century Indian male actors
1947 births